Justin Longmuir (born 21 January 1981) is a former Australian rules footballer who is the current senior coach of the Fremantle Football Club in the Australian Football League. Longmuir played for Fremantle between 1999 and 2007.

Playing career

Fremantle Football Club
Longmuir was recruited by the Fremantle Football Club as the number 2 draft pick in the 1998 AFL Draft (from West Perth Football Club) and made his debut in Round 22, 1999, against Geelong at Shell Stadium. Longmuir played for Fremantle Football Club from 1999 until 2007, where he played a total of 139 games as a forward and ruckman, kicking 166 goals.

He played 21 of the 22 games in 2005 and led the club in hard ball gets and finished third in the club for contested marks and overall marks. The most memorable moment in 2005 was his after-the-siren goal to snatch victory over St Kilda in Round 21. He took a big pack mark, which prompted Nine commentator Eddie McGuire to shout "Longmuir's taken a screamer!". 

Longmuir showed plenty of composure under pressure and was considered dangerous when he was at his peak.

Longmuir's career was put on hold as he battled a degenerative knee injury, and eventually conceded his retirement from AFL on 31 October 2007 due to the knee injury, which saw him play just 18 games in his last 2 years.

Coaching career

West Coast Eagles assistant coach 
Longmuir was appointed as an assistant coach in the role of development coach of the West Coast Eagles under senior coach John Worsfold at the end of the 2010 season. At the end of the 2011 season, Longmuir switched his assistant coaching position to the role of forward coach, replacing Peter Sumich, who switched to Longmuir's former club, Fremantle. Longmuir then spent seven years as an assistant coach at West Coast Eagles, including under senior coach Adam Simpson, who replaced Worsfold at the end of the 2013 season. Longmuir left the West Coast Eagles at the end of the 2017 season.

Collingwood Football Club assistant coach
At the end of the 2017 season, Longmuir was appointed as an assistant coach in the role of the defence coach at Collingwood under senior coach Nathan Buckley.

Fremantle Football Club senior coach (2019-present)
In September 2019, after nine years as an assistant coach with both West Coast and Collingwood, Longmuir was named new senior coach at his former club , replacing caretaker senior coach David Hale, who replaced Ross Lyon during the 2019 season with one game left to go. Longmuir's first season as senior coach was during the shortened COVID-19-affected 2020 AFL season. Fremantle finished twelfth on the AFL ladder with seven wins and ten losses. 

The 2021 AFL season saw the Dockers under Longmuir finish eleventh place on the ladder, with ten wins and twelve losses.

In the 2022 AFL season, Longmuir guided the Dockers to fifth position on the ladder and a return to finals for the first time since 2015.

Personal life

Longmuir grew up in Koorda, 236 kilometres east of Perth. He is the brother of former Melbourne, Fremantle and Carlton player Troy Longmuir.

Statistics

Playing statistics
 Statistics are correct to the end of 2007

|- style="background-color: #EAEAEA"
! scope="row" style="text-align:center" | 1999
|
| 20 || 1 || 1 || 0 || 2 || 3 || 5 || 1 || 1 || 4 || 1.0 || 0.0 || 2.0 || 3.0 || 5.0 || 1.0 || 1.0 || 4.0 || 0
|-
! scope="row" style="text-align:center" | 2000
|
| 20 || 12 || 3 || 2 || 58 || 35 || 93 || 27 || 8 || 97 || 0.3 || 0.2 || 4.8 || 2.9 || 7.8 || 2.3 || 0.7 || 8.1 || 0
|- style="background-color: #EAEAEA"
! scope="row" style="text-align:center" | 2001
|
| 20 || 22 || 28 || 13 || 161 || 120 || 281 || 95 || 31 || 248 || 1.3 || 0.6 || 7.3 || 5.5 || 12.8 || 4.3 || 1.4 || 11.3 || 4
|-
! scope="row" style="text-align:center" | 2002
|
| 20 || 22 || 36 || 29 || 152 || 78 || 230 || 111 || 26 || 101 || 1.6 || 1.3 || 6.9 || 3.5 || 10.5 || 5.0 || 1.2 || 4.6 || 1
|- style="background-color: #EAEAEA"
! scope="row" style="text-align:center" | 2003
|
| 20 || 22 || 38 || 29 || 121 || 50 || 171 || 78 || 24 || 81 || 1.7 || 1.3 || 5.5 || 2.3 || 7.8 || 3.5 || 1.1 || 3.7 || 3
|-
! scope="row" style="text-align:center" | 2004
|
| 20 || 21 || 26 || 14 || 170 || 129 || 299 || 106 || 47 || 219 || 1.2 || 0.7 || 8.1 || 6.1 || 14.2 || 5.0 || 2.2 || 10.4 || 0
|- style="background-color: #EAEAEA"
! scope="row" style="text-align:center" | 2005
|
| 20 || 21 || 15 || 6 || 178 || 120 || 298 || 107 || 34 || 226 || 0.7 || 0.3 || 8.5 || 5.7 || 14.2 || 5.1 || 1.6 || 10.8 || 3
|-
! scope="row" style="text-align:center" | 2006
|
| 20 || 16 || 19 || 14 || 116 || 80 || 196 || 74 || 21 || 98 || 1.2 || 0.9 || 7.3 || 5.0 || 12.3 || 4.6 || 1.3 || 6.1 || 4
|- style="background-color: #EAEAEA"
! scope="row" style="text-align:center" | 2007
|
| 20 || 2 || 0 || 1 || 8 || 10 || 18 || 5 || 2 || 6 || 0.0 || 0.5 || 4.0 || 5.0 || 9.0 || 2.5 || 1.0 || 3.0 || 0
|- class="sortbottom"
! colspan=3| Career
! 139
! 166
! 108
! 966
! 625
! 1591
! 604
! 194
! 1080
! 1.2
! 0.8
! 6.9
! 4.5
! 11.4
! 4.3
! 1.4
! 7.8
! 15
|}

Coaching statistics
 Statistics are correct to end of 2022.

|- style="background-color: #EAEAEA"
! scope="row" style="text-align:center; font-weight:normal" | 2020
|style="text-align:center;"|
| 17 || 7 || 10 || 0 || 41.2% || 12 || 18
|-
! scope="row" style="text-align:center; font-weight:normal" | 2021
|style="text-align:center;"|
| 22 || 10 || 12 || 0 || 45.5% || 11 || 18
|- style="background-color: #EAEAEA"
! scope="row" style="text-align:center; font-weight:normal" | 2022
|style="text-align:center;"|
| 24 || 16 || 7 || 1 || 68.8% || 5 || 18
|- 
! colspan=2| Career totals
! 63
! 33
! 29
! 1
! 53.1%
! colspan=2|
|}

See also
After the siren kicks in Australian rules football

References

External links

1981 births
Living people
Fremantle Football Club players
Fremantle Football Club coaches
West Perth Football Club players
Australian people of Scottish descent
Australian rules footballers from Western Australia